Nikolaos Vlangalis (26 October 1907 – 1978) was a Greek sailor. He competed at the 1948 Summer Olympics and the 1960 Summer Olympics.

References

External links
 

1907 births
1978 deaths
Greek male sailors (sport)
Olympic sailors of Greece
Sailors at the 1948 Summer Olympics – Star
Sailors at the 1960 Summer Olympics – Star
Sailors (sport) from Athens